The flora of the Colorado Plateau and Canyonlands region of the Western United States.

The flora is generally characterized by plant adaptations to the arid conditions of the region, and a wide variation of plant communities from wide variations in elevation and soil types. The elevation variation results in temperature variation. Differing soil types are largely due to erosion of different sedimentary layers in the canyons, from the layers at lowest point of canyons of the Colorado River network, to the top layers of the plateau. Exceptions to flora adapted to aridity occur in lowland riparian areas, at springs, and in hanging gardens.

Plant communities

Salt desert shrub community 
The salt desert shrub is a plant community or vegetation type found in the Colorado Plateau and Canyonlands region. It is characterized by very alkaline and saline soils and plants that can tolerate these conditions (halophytes). Dominant plant species include shadscale (Atriplex confertifolia), greasewood (Sarcobatus vermiculatus), and Mormon tea (Ephedra viridis).

Blackbrush scrub community

Sand desert shrub community
The sand desert shrub (SDS) is a plant community, or vegetation type, found in the Colorado Plateau and Canyonlands region in areas of shifting sands or very sandy soils. Dominant plant species include old man sage (Artemisia filifolia), yucca, Indian ricegrass (Stipa hymenoides), and wavy leaf oak (Quercus welshii). A common characteristic of plants in this community is a very deep and extensive root system, which helps stabilize the sand dunes, or an ability to adjust to the shifting sands.

Mixed desert shrub community 
Mixed desert shrub is a plant community, or vegetation type, found in the Colorado Plateau and Canyonlands region of the southwestern United States. It is supported by a range of overlapping and intergrading soil types. Characteristic dominant plant species include rubber rabbitbrush (Chrysothamnus nauseosus), fourwinged saltbrush (Atriplex canescens), blackbrush (Coleogyne ramosissima), and dwarf mountain mahogany (Cercocarpus intricatus). It is generally located at the elevation belt (zone) above sand desert shrub and below cool desert shrub.

Pinyon juniper woodland community

Mountain brush community
Mountain brush is a plant community or vegetation type of the Colorado Plateau and Canyonlands region. It covers large parts of the mountain foothills and shaded canyons in areas below the Ponderosa pine community. It is characterized by dominance by shrubby Gambel's Oak (Quercus gambelii), Utah serviceberry (Amelanchier utahensis), sagebrush (Artemisia tridentata), and mountain mahogany (Cercocarpus montanus).

Ponderosa pine forest

References 

 
Colorado Plateau
Colorado Plateau
Colorado Plateau
Colorado Plateau
Colorado Plateau
 Colorado Plateau
Colorado Plateau